Kleinzeit is a metaphysical novel by Russell Hoban.

Plot introduction
Hoban's second novel for adults, Kleinzeit is a story detailing the eponymous title character's brush with illness and creativity.  When Kleinzeit is fired from his job as an advertising copy-writer, he ends up in hospital with a ‘skewed hypotenuse’, being tended by the healthy and desirable Sister.  Together, they embark on a strange adventure, in which Kleinzeit struggles to get better, attempts to master his creative urges, and holds conversations with a variety of abstract concepts.  The central character shares many traits with Hoban himself, and the author has commented: ‘I think there's most of me in Kleinzeit’.

Characters in Kleinzeit

Kleinzeit – the central character, whose name means ‘smalltime’ in German
Sister – a nurse at the hospital, who begins a relationship with Kleinzeit
Redbeard – a homeless busker who leaves Kleinzeit a sheet of yellow paper, and ends up in the same hospital ward

Major themes
Kleinzeit's physical illness and his creative urges are linked in the novel, an identification strengthened by the fact that all the diseases suffered by patients on Kleinzeit's ward (ward A4, like the paper) are literary, geometric or musical terms: he himself has a painful hypotenuse and diapason and develops a faulty stretto, while other patients suffer from hendiadys or ‘imbricated noumena’.  The terror and allure of creativity are symbolised by the mysterious yellow paper, which Redbeard passes on to Kleinzeit.  Kleinzeit's relationship with a blank piece of paper is depicted as a sexual romance, with the writing process seen as a consummation, albeit that Kleinzeit is cuckolded by the personification of Word.  Many abstract concepts are similarly personified, including Death, Hospital, the (London) Underground (which is associated with the myth of Orpheus), Action and God.

Allusions/references to other works
As with many of Hoban's works, a number of other literary and mythical works are referred to, including:

the myth of Orpheus and Eurydice
John Milton's poem L'Allegro (which itself refers to Orpheus and Eurydice)
Thucydides's work the History of the Peloponnesian War

Release details
1974, London: Jonathan Cape 
2002, London: Bloomsbury , paperback

See Also
The Medusa Frequency (1987), a subsequent Russell Hoban book which also reinterprets the myth of Orpheus and Eurydice

External links
Kleinzeit at the Head of Orpheus fansite
Searchable concordance of Kleinzeit

1974 British novels
Novels by Russell Hoban
Jonathan Cape books